Into My World may refer to:

 "Into My World", a 1996 song by Audioweb
 "Into My World", a 2000 song by Melissa Bell and Dazz
 "Into My World", a 2018 song by Exo from Countdown